The Padang Besar railway station (Stesen Keretapi Padang Besar) is a railway station located at and named after the border town of Padang Besar, Perlis in Malaysia. It is the northernmost station of the west coast line where the line connects to the State Railway of Thailand's rail network via its Southern Line.

Location and locality 
This station is located in Padang Besar, Perlis in Malaysia with distance only 200 metres from the actual border between Malaysia and Thailand. This station should not be confused with another station of Padang Besar (Thai) which is located on the Thailand side town of Padang Besar and fully operated by SRT. 

Despite being under Malaysian territory and mainly under Malaysia's Railway Asset Corporation and KTMB managements, this station is where the Malaysia and Thai railway services end and also meet, allowing for passengers to transfer between the two railway systems. SRT also operates a ticket office for their trains that serves this station, and accept Malaysian Ringgit as well in ticket purchases. The two countries also has the immigration, customs and quarantine offices co-located in this station specifically for train passengers here.

Padang Besar railway station also has a freight yard that serves as a dry port for the northern part of Malaysia and Indonesia–Malaysia–Thailand Growth Triangle.

While the name also tells that it serve the locality of Padang Besar town in Perlis and indeed is located near the town, there's no direct pedestrian or vehicle access to the town unless from a junction from Route 7 that is located even before the town. There used to be an overpass that allows pedestrian to cross over the freight yard to the town areas, but it is since has been closed for access, pending upgrading works. Passengers who wishes to go to the town or the main immigration building either need to book a taxi or walk a few kilometres across the Federal Route 7 main route.

Train services
Padang Besar railway station is served by trains operated by both Keretapi Tanah Melayu and the State Railway of Thailand.

Train services by Keretapi Tanah Melayu serving Malaysian destinations are:
KTM Komuter Utara - 16 arrivals/departures a day from/to Butterworth
KTM ETS - 4 arrivals/departures per day from/to KL Sentral, Kuala Lumpur
KTM ETS - 1 arrival/departure per day from/to Gemas, Negeri Sembilan via KL Sentral
KTM Intercity MySawadee 1004/1005 - stop-by for immigration service of train passenger between KL Sentral and Hat Yai. Seasonal trains with irregular dates each month.

Train services by the State Railway of Thailand serving destinations in Thailand are:
Train 45/46 Special Express - 1 arrival/departure per day from/to Krung Thep Aphiwat, combined service with Train 37/38 Special Express in Hat Yai 
Trains 947/948 and 949/950 Ordinary Express - 2 arrivals/departures from/to Hat Yai

Railway border crossing
The Padang Besar railway station has Malaysia's only co-located or juxtaposed border crossing checkpoint where customs, immigration and quarantine facilities for both Malaysia and Thailand are housed inside the station which is wholly located inside Malaysia territory (200 metres south of the border). The facilities for each country operate from separate counters inside the railway station building at the platform level. After disembarking from a train, rail passengers are processed for exiting or entering both countries by walking from one counter to the other before boarding trains travelling into the relevant countries. 

While bears the same entry and exit point names as their main immigration checkpoints (Padang Besar/Padang Besa), these facilities operates differently from their main immigration complex on the roadway side of the border, open mainly for rail passengers that are making interchange between two system trains and also passengers on Malaysian side who want to board any Thailand trains. The station also only can be accessed by road on Malaysia side, thus those from Thailand cannot use these facilities without boarding any trains beforehand and need to use the roadside main checkpoint before going to the station to board any Malaysian trains. The facilities will be open only when Thailand trains is departing or just arriving at the station, thus making clearance not possible after the last train to Hat Yai departs at 4.40 P.M Malaysian time as no more passengers that would cross the border at this station on the day. 

There are currently no regular trains going across the Malaysia–Thailand border with the State Railway of Thailand's International Express no longer serving Butterworth, Malaysia and the termination of Keretapi Tanah Melayu's Senandung Langkawi and later, Ekspres Semenanjung service to Hat Yai. Most Malaysian and Thai trains now terminate at this station and as such, passengers would already have completed their CIQ procedures before boarding their trains. Previously for the International Express and KTM's express service to Hat Yai, passengers would have to disembark, go through the CIQ procedures from both countries inside the station before reboarding the train for their onward journey. Trains would wait for all passengers to be processed before departing. However KTM introduced a seasonal monthly Ekspres Sawadee between Kuala Lumpur and Hat Yai in October 2022, which repeats the same procedures when crossing the border.

External links 

Keretapi Tanah Melayu
State Railway of Thailand

References

KTM ETS railway stations
Railway stations in Perlis
Railway stations opened in 1918
Juxtaposed border controls